is a Japanese actor. He is represented with Stardust Promotion. He is the second son of actor Hideo Nakano. He was previously credited as only Taiga.

Career

Filmography

Film

Short films

TV series

Internet dramas

Radio dramas

Stage

Advertisements

Music videos

Accolades
6th Tama Film Awards Best Emerging Actor Award (Hotori no Sakuko, Daily Lives of High School Boys, Jinrō Game, Monsterz, My Man, Sweet Poolside)
38th Yokohama Film Festival: Best Newcomer (Destruction Babies) (2017)
76th Mainichi Film Awards: Best Supporting Actor (Under the Open Sky) (2022)
46th Elan d'or Awards: Newcomer of the Year (2022)
64th Blue Ribbon Awards: Best Supporting Actor (2022)

Notes

References

External links
 - 

1993 births
Living people
Male actors from Tokyo
Stardust Promotion artists
21st-century Japanese male actors